is a Japanese professional golfer.

Okuda played on the Japan Golf Tour, winning six times.

Professional wins (9)

Japan Golf Tour wins (6)

*Note: The 1992 TaylorMade KSB Open was shortened to 54 holes due to rain.

Japan Golf Tour playoff record (1–1)

Other wins (1)
2015 Legend Charity Pro-Am

Japan PGA Senior Tour wins (2)
2013 Fujifilm Senior Championship
2014 Kyoraku More Surprise Cup

External links

Japanese male golfers
Japan Golf Tour golfers
PGA Tour Champions golfers
Sportspeople from Osaka Prefecture
1960 births
Living people